Juventus Fútbol Club , also known as Juventus or Juventus Managua, is a Nicaraguan professional football club based in Managua, Nicaragua which currently plays in the Nicaraguan Premier Division.

History
Juventus Managua was founded in 1977, and has been in and out of Nicaragua's first division ever since.  Their greatest period of success was in the early 1990s, when they won back to back championships in 1993 and 1994.  After that, they spent a long time outside of the First Division, not returning until 2011.  Since their return in 2011, the club has been solidly mid-table.  They successfully weathered a serious financial crisis in 2014.

Achievements

Domestic Achievements
 Primera División de Nicaragua and predecessors 
 Champions (2) : 1993, 1994

 Segunda División de Nicaragua and predecessors 
 Champions (1) : 2010-11

Performance in CONCACAF competitions

CONCACAF Champions' Cup: 4 appearances
Best: First Round in 1993. 1995 and 1996
1993 : Preliminary Round
1994 : First Round
1995 : First Round
1996 : First Round

Record versus other nations
 As of 2013-09-13
The Concacaf opponents below = Official tournament results: 
(Plus a sampling of other results)

List of Coaches
  Salvador Dubois Leiva
  Edison Oquendo (1993–1994)
  Douglas Urbina (2009 – Oct 2013)
  Oscar Blanco (Oct 2013 – May 2014)
  Douglas Urbina (June 2014 – June 2015)
  Oscar Blanco (July 2015 – June 2016)
  Javier Londoño (June 2016– June 2017)
  Javier Martínez (June 2017– Dec 2017)
  Oscar Blanco (Jan 2018– Feb 2018)
  Héctor Mediana (Feb 2018– June 2018)
  Roberto Chanampe (July 2018 - Dec 2019)
  Héctor Mediana (Dec 2019 - April 2020)
  Jaime Ruiz (April 2020 - May 2020)
  Oscar Blanco (May 2020 - Present)

References

External links
 Official website 
 Regresa el Juventus – La Prensa 

 
Football clubs in Nicaragua
1977 establishments in Nicaragua
Association football clubs established in 1977